Nope usually means "no".

Nope may also refer to:

Film and television
Nope (film), 2022 American neo-Western science fiction horror film
"Nope", a 2000 episode of Any Day Now

Songs
"Nope", from the 2007 Soulja Boy Tell 'Em album Souljaboytellem.com
"Nope", from the 2013 Young Dro album High Times
"Nope", from the 2013 Snow The Product mixtape Good Nights & Bad Mornings 2: The Hangover
"Nope", from the 2016 Wilco album Schmilco
"Nope", from the 2017 Vijay Iyer album Far From Over
"Nope", from the 2018 Wussy album What Heaven Is Like

Other
Nope, a surname used by the ruling family of West Timor's Amanuban princedom
NOPE, the code for the Nanterre-Université service of the Transilien Paris-Saint-Lazare